Cavalry Sunday is the annual parade of the Combined Cavalry Old Comrades Association which takes place in Hyde Park, London, England, on the second Sunday of May each year. Serving and retired officers and soldiers of the Cavalry and Yeomanry regiments of the British Army march to a service and commemoration around the band stand in the southeast corner of Hyde Park and the nearby memorial to the bombing which took place there.  The old troopers typically wear suits with bowler hats, and march with furled umbrellas.

External links
 8 May 2022 – video coverage of the 2022 event

References

Annual events in London
Cavalry regiments of the British Army
Hyde Park, London
Military parades in the United Kingdom
Veterans days